The First Kishida Cabinet was the 100th Cabinet of Japan. Formed by Fumio Kishida on October 4, 2021, it had 21 members, including three women. Two ministers, Foreign Minister Toshimitsu Motegi and Defense Minister Nobuo Kishi, retained their posts from the previous cabinet. The government is a coalition between the Liberal Democratic Party and the Komeito who controlled both the upper and lower houses of the National Diet.

After just 37 days it was replaced by the Second Kishida Cabinet following the 2021 election, making it the shortest-serving cabinet in Japanese history.

Election of the Prime Minister

List of Ministers 

R = Member of the House of Representatives

C = Member of the House of Councillors

B = Bureaucrat

Cabinet 
Citation of this table: List of First Kishida Cabinet Members

Deputy Chief Cabinet Secretary and Director-General of the Cabinet Legislation Bureau

Special Adviser to the Prime Minister

State Ministers

Parliamentary Vice-Ministers

References

External links 
Pages at the Kantei (English website):
List of Ministers October 2021 – November 2021

Cabinet of Japan
2021 establishments in Japan
Cabinets established in 2021
Cabinets disestablished in 2021
2021 in Japanese politics